In the Battle of Lützen (German: Schlacht von Großgörschen, 2 May 1813), Napoleon I of France defeated an allied army of the Sixth Coalition. 

The Russian commander, Prince Peter Wittgenstein, attempting to forestall Napoleon's capture of Leipzig, attacked the French right wing near Lützen, Saxony-Anhalt, Germany, surprising Napoleon. Quickly recovering, he ordered a double envelopment of the allies. After a day of heavy fighting, the imminent encirclement of his army prompted Wittgenstein to retreat. Due to a shortage of cavalry, the French did not pursue. 

The next battle would be fought at Bautzen three weeks later.

Prelude
Following the disaster of French invasion of Russia in 1812, a new Coalition consisting of Britain, Sweden, Prussia and Russia formed against France. In response to this, Napoleon hastily assembled an army of just over 200,000 which included inexperienced recruits, troops from Spain and garrison battalions but was severely short of horses (a consequence of the Russian invasion, where most of his veteran troops and horses had perished). He crossed the Rhine into Germany to link up with remnants of his old Grande Armée under the command of Prince Eugène de Beauharnais, and to quickly defeat this new alliance before it became too strong.

On the 30 April Napoleon crossed the river Saale, advancing on Leipzig from the west and southwest in three columns led by the V Corps under General Jacques Lauriston. His intention was to work his way into the Coalition's interior lines, dividing their forces and defeating them in detail before they could combine. But due to the lack of cavalrymen and faulty reconnaissance, he was unaware of the Russo-Prussian army under Wittgenstein and Graf (Count) von Blücher concentrating on his right flank to the southeast. Prussian scouts reported that the French army was stretched between Naumberg and Leipzig.  Wittgenstein's plan was to attack towards Lützen and split Napoleon's forces in two. He was hoping to inflict serious casualties on Napoleon and score a victory that could possibly be used to bring Austria into the Coalition. On the eve of the battle, one of Napoleon's marshals, Jean-Baptiste Bessières, was killed by a stray cannonball while reconnoitering near Rippach.

Marshal Ney's III Corps was to hold the right flank around Lützen in support of the forces marching towards Leipzig and was caught by surprise. The III Corps consisted of five infantry divisions and a cavalry brigade. Three of these divisions were situated around Lützen, one division in the four villages to the southeast (Kaja, Kleingörschen, Großgörschen and Rahna) and one division a mile to the west of these in Starsiedel. The French VI Corps under Marshal Marmont was at Rippach to the west, Bertrand's IV Corps was south of Weissenfels (Weißenfels) where the Imperial Guard was also located. Macdonald's XI Corps and the I Cavalry Corps were situated to the north of Lützen.

Battle
The Prussian attack started off late with Blücher leading with his corps about 11:30am. As they approached Großgörschen, he was only expecting a couple thousand French instead of the full division that he found. Blücher paused the attack, called up his artillery and started an artillery bombardment at about noon. Marmont to the west heard the sound of the cannon and moved his corps towards Starsiedel. After a 40 minute bombardment, Blücher sent in one brigade that drove the French out of Großgörschen then followed up with another brigade and cavalry that captured Kleingörschen and Rahna. Ney put himself at the head of one of his divisions moving south from Lützen and counterattacked, retaking Kleingörschen and Rahna. Blücher committed his last brigade about 2:00pm, which forced the French out of Kleingörschen and then advanced to Kaja. Blücher was wounded, leaving the Prussian forces to the command of General von Yorck.

Napoleon was visiting the 1632 battlefield, playing tour guide with his staff by pointing to the sites and describing the events of 1632, in detail from memory, when he heard the sound of cannon. He immediately cut the tour short and rode off towards the direction of the artillery fire. Arriving on the scene about 2:00pm, he quickly sized up the situation and sent orders to concentrate his forces. He sent Ney a steady stream of reinforcements which would take up positions in and around the villages south of Lützen. Yorck committed the recently arrived Prussian reserves about 4:00pm. Wittgenstein and Yorck continued to press Ney in the center; control of the villages switched hands multiple times as troops were committed from both sides. The King of Prussia personally led a charge of the Prussian Guard that took the village of Rahna. By 5:30pm, the Coalition held all of the villages except for Kaja, which was still contested. Once Bertrand's IV Corps approached the battlefield from his right and Macdonald's XI Corps from his left, Napoleon no longer needed to worry about his flanks.

Once the Coalition's advance had been halted, with the perfect timing of old, Napoleon struck. While he had been reinforcing Ney, he had also reinforced the guns of the III Corps and VI Corps located between Starsiedel and Rahna with the Guard's cannons.  General Drouot concentrated these into a great mass of artillery of about 100 guns (Grande Batterie) that unleashed a devastating barrage on Wittgenstein's center. Napoleon had collected his Imperial Guard behind these guns and sent them in a counter assault led by Marshal Mortier into the allied center at about 6:00pm, which cleared the Coalition forces from the villages. A Prussian cavalry attack, and encroaching darkness, slowed the French offensive, allowing the main Coalition army to retreat in good order to regroup south of the villages. The lack of French cavalry prevented pursuit. Napoleon lost 19,655 men, including 2,757 killed and 16,898 wounded, while the Prussians lost at least 8,500 men killed or wounded and the Russians lost 3,500 men killed, wounded or missing, although casualties may have been much higher. By nightfall, the Tsar and Wittgenstein were hardly convinced that they had lost the battle. They retreated, however, after hearing that Leipzig had fallen, leaving Napoleon in control of Lützen and the field.

Aftermath

Napoleon demonstrated his usual prowess in driving back the Russo-Prussian force at Lützen, but the costliness of his victory had a major impact on the war. Lützen was followed by the Battle of Bautzen eighteen days later, where Napoleon was again victorious but with the loss of another 22,000 men, twice as many as the Russo-Prussian army. The ferocity of these two battles prompted Napoleon to accept a temporary armistice on the 4 June with Tsar Alexander and King Frederick William III. This agreement provided the allies the respite to organise and re-equip their armies and, perhaps more importantly, encouraged Britain to provide Russia and Prussia with war subsidies totalling seven million pounds. The financial security offered by this agreement was a major boon to the war effort against Napoleon. Another important result of the battle was that it encouraged Austria to join the allied coalition upon the armistice's expiration, shifting the balance of power dramatically in the coalition's favor. Due to these developments, Napoleon later regarded the June 4 truce, bought at Lützen and Bautzen, as the undoing of his power in Germany.

During the battle of Lützen, Gerhard von Scharnhorst, one of the brightest and most able Prussian generals, was wounded while serving as Wittgenstein's Chief of Staff. Although his wound was minor, the hasty retreat prevented proper treatment, allowing a fatal infection to set in.

Notes

References

Further reading

External links
A shorter account of Lützen at napoleonguide.com
Russian Army of the Napoleonic Wars

Battles of the War of the Sixth Coalition
Battles of the Napoleonic Wars
Battles inscribed on the Arc de Triomphe
Battles involving France
Battles involving Prussia
Battles involving Russia
Conflicts in 1813
May 1813 events
Battle of Lutzen (1813)
Battles in Saxony-Anhalt
Lützen (1813)